Cozy Tapes Vol. 2: Too Cozy is the second studio album by American hip hop collective ASAP Mob. It was released on August 25, 2017, by ASAP Worldwide, Polo Grounds Music and RCA Records. The album features guest appearances from Big Sean, Playboi Carti, Pro Era, Quavo, Lil Uzi Vert, Lil Yachty, Chief Keef, Gucci Mane, Schoolboy Q, Frank Ocean, Jaden Smith, Smooky Margielaa and Flatbush Zombies. It was preceded by two singles, "Raf" featuring ASAP Rocky, Playboi Carti, Quavo, Lil Uzi Vert and Frank Ocean, and "Feels So Good" featuring ASAP Rocky, ASAP Ferg, ASAP Nast, ASAP Twelvyy and ASAP Ant.

Background
On July 4, 2017, ASAP Mob confirmed the second installment of their Cozy Tapes series. Its released was preceded by solo releases from two other ASAP Mob members in August, with ASAP Twelvyy's 12 album on August 4 and ASAP Ferg's Still Striving album on August 18.

The track listing surfaced online on August 22, a few days before release.

Promotion
The album's promotional single, "Wrong" featuring ASAP Rocky and ASAP Ferg, was released on April 28, 2017, it was produced by Harry Fraud, which did not make the final track listing.

The music video for the song, titled "RAF", was released on July 24, 2017, directed by ASAP Rocky and Austin Winchell.

On July 25, 2017, ASAP Mob announced the Too Cozy Tour to accompany the album across the United States from September to November 2017.

Singles
The lead single, "RAF" featuring ASAP Rocky, Playboi Carti, Quavo, Lil Uzi Vert and Frank Ocean, was released on May 15, 2017. The second single, "Feels So Good" featuring ASAP Rocky, ASAP Ferg, ASAP Nast, ASAP Twelvyy and ASAP Ant, was released on August 16, 2017.

Critical reception

Cozy Tapes Vol. 2: Too Cozy received generally positive reviews from critics. At Metacritic, which assigns a normalized rating out of 100 to reviews from mainstream publications, the album received an average score of 70, based on five reviews. M.T. Richards of Exclaim! criticised the album for a lack of originality and cohesion: "Rocky and his acolytes convene for a rundown of trends worth exploiting; as such, it often sounds like a Migos album as interpreted by 16 clueless New Yorkers. The lack of thump and energy is fatal, throwing cold water on any chance Rocky may have had at profiting off of Migos' grassroots momentum. At its best ("Frat Rules"), CTV2 is perfunctory; at its worst ("Get a Bag"), it denotes a scornful disinterest in what makes club-goers tick." Greg Whitt of Consequence of Sound commented that Cozy Tapes Vol. 2 has "a loose family vibe. One gets the sense that almost anyone who dropped by the studio as they were recording had the chance to make the album. As such, the album’s not a show of force, it’s a party."

Commercial performance
Cozy Tapes Vol. 2 debuted at number six on the US Billboard 200 with 41,000 album-equivalent units. The album also entered at number 54 on the UK Albums Chart, selling 1,000 album-equivalent units in its first week. It also entered at number 22 on the UK R&B Chart.

Track listing
Credits were adapted from Tidal.

Notes
  signifies a co-producer
  signifies an additional producer
  signifies an uncredited additional producer
 Contrary to the credits, "Blowin' Minds (Skateboard)" does not feature vocals by ASAP Ant.
 "Skool Bus (Skit)", "Principal Daryl Choad (Skit)" and "Last Day of Skool (Skit)" feature vocals by John C. Reilly, Lil Duvet and Yung Frosty.
 "Get the Bag" features additional vocals by ASAP Twelvyy.
 "What Happens" features additional vocals by ASAP Twelvyy and Playboi Carti.

Sample credits
 "BYF" contains a sample of "Swole Pocket Shawty", performed by Gucci Mane.

Personnel
Credits adapted from Tidal.

Musicians
 Mike Carpenter – keyboards 

Technical

 Hector Delgado – recording , mixing 
 Frans Mernick – recording 
 Lynas – recording 
 Desi Aguilar – mixing assistant 
 Federico "C Sik" Lopez – recording , mixing assistant 
 Dan Fyfe – mixing assistant 
 Maximilian Jaeger – recording 
 Gregg Rominiecki – recording

Charts

Weekly charts

Year-end charts

Certifications

References

2017 albums
ASAP Mob albums
Albums produced by Frank Dukes
Albums produced by Hit-Boy
Albums produced by RZA
Albums produced by Southside (record producer)
Albums produced by Pi'erre Bourne
Albums produced by Vegyn
RCA Records albums
Sequel albums